Abraham Greenawalt (1834 – October 27, 1922) was a soldier in the Union Army during the American Civil War. He earned the Medal of Honor for the capture of a Confederate corps headquarters flag at the Second Battle of Franklin, Tennessee, on November 30, 1864.

Abraham Greenawalt is buried in Alliance, Ohio. The Greenawalt family were members of the Evangelical Lutheran Church.

Medal of Honor citation
Rank and organization: Private, Company G, 104th Ohio Infantry
Place and date: At Franklin, Tennessee, November 30, 1864
Entered service at: Salem, Ohio
Birth: Montgomery County, Pennsylvania
Date of issue: February 13, 1865

Citation:
Capture of corps headquarters flag (C.S.A.).

See also
List of American Civil War Medal of Honor recipients: G–L

Notes

References

External links
 104th Ohio Infantry by Larry Stevens
 Northwest Ohio in the Civil War
 Battle of Utoy Creek

1834 births
1922 deaths
United States Army Medal of Honor recipients
United States Army soldiers
People of Ohio in the American Civil War
People from Montgomery County, Pennsylvania
People from Salem, Ohio
American Civil War recipients of the Medal of Honor